ALBA or ALBA–TCP, formally the Bolivarian Alliance for the Peoples of Our America or the Bolivarian Alliance for the Peoples of Our America – Peoples' Trade Treaty, is an intergovernmental organization based on the idea of political and economic integration of Latin American and Caribbean countries.

Founded initially by Cuba and Venezuela in 2004, it is associated with socialist and social democratic governments wishing to consolidate regional economic integration based on a vision of social welfare, bartering and mutual economic aid. The ten member countries are Antigua and Barbuda, Bolivia, Cuba, Dominica, Grenada, Nicaragua, Saint Kitts and Nevis, Saint Lucia, Saint Vincent and the Grenadines and Venezuela. Suriname was admitted to ALBA as a guest country at a February 2012 summit. ALBA nations may conduct trade using a virtual currency known as the SUCRE. Venezuela and Ecuador made the first bilateral trade deal using the Sucre, instead of the US dollar, on 6 July 2010. Ecuador withdrew from the group in August 2018.

The name initially contained "Alternative" instead of "Alliance", but was changed on 24 June 2009.

History 

The agreement was proposed by the government of Venezuela, led by Hugo Chávez as an alternative to the Free Trade Area of the Americas (FTAA or ALCA in Spanish, an agreement proposed by the United States), which never materialized.

This Cuba–Venezuela Agreement, signed on 14 December 2004, by Presidents Chávez and Fidel Castro, was aimed at the exchange of medical and educational resources and petroleum between the two nations. Venezuela began to deliver about 96,000 barrels of oil per day from its state-owned oil company, PDVSA, to Cuba at very favorable prices. In exchange, Cuba sent 20,000 state-employed medical staff and thousands of teachers to Venezuela's poorest states. The agreement also made it possible for Venezuelans to travel to Cuba for specialized medical care, free of charge.

When it was launched in 2004, ALBA had only two member states, Venezuela and Cuba. Subsequently, a number of other Latin American and Caribbean nations entered into this 'Peoples' Trade Agreement' (Spanish: Tratado de Comercio de los Pueblos, or TCP), which aims to implement the principles of ALBA. Bolivia under Evo Morales joined in 2006, Nicaragua under Daniel Ortega in 2007, and Ecuador under Rafael Correa in 2009. Honduras, under Manuel Zelaya, joined in 2008, but withdrew in 2010 after the 2009 Honduran coup d'état. The Caribbean nations Antigua and Barbuda, Dominica, Saint Vincent and the Grenadines and Saint Lucia also joined.

Jamaica, at the invitation of Chávez, and Mexico, at the invitation of Ortega, were invited to join the ALBA countries. Chávez also invited the countries of Central America to join ALBA, and invited Argentina to use SUCRE. In the 11th Summit of ALBA in February 2012, Suriname, Saint Lucia and Haiti requested admission to the organization. Haiti was granted the special status of permanent member and the other two countries were named special members, while awaiting their full incorporation.

In July 2013, Chávez was honored posthumously by the nine member countries of the group and special guests Uruguay, Argentina, Brazil, Suriname, Guyana and Haiti at the group's 12th Presidential Summit in Guayaquil, Ecuador.

In December 2014, Grenada and Saint Kitts and Nevis were accepted as full members during the 13th Summit of the Alliance, which occurred in Havana, Cuba.

Ecuador withdrew from ALBA in August 2018. Bolivia's interim government withdrew in November 2019 during the political crisis, but the newly elected government of Luis Arce rejoined following the 2020 Bolivian general election.

Amid the international isolation Russia is facing due to the invasion of Ukraine, ALBA invited Russia to participate at the 2023 ALBA Games.

Virtual currency
In October 2009, ALBA leaders agreed at a summit in Bolivia to create a virtual currency. "The document is approved," said Bolivian President Evo Morales, the summit host. President of Venezuela Hugo Chávez announced "The sucre [is] an autonomous and sovereign monetary system that will be agreed upon today so that it can be implemented in 2010." As of 2015, the virtual currency is being used to compensate trade between Bolivia, Cuba, Nicaragua, and especially Ecuador and Venezuela.

Summits of heads of state and government

Membership

Full members

Observer members

Former members 

In addition, Suriname is a "special guest member" that intends to become a full member.

Other ALBA initiatives

PetroCaribe
Based on the earlier San José Accords (1980) and Caracas Energy Accords (2000) between Venezuela and a number of Caribbean states, Petrocaribe was founded in 2005 to facilitate oil trade under a concessionary financial agreement. The initiative has provided the Caribbean member states with important hydrocarbon resources, which many do not possess on their territories, in exchange for services and goods. In the case of Cuba, a nation largely deprived of oil since the fall of the Soviet Union in 1991, Petrocaribe has provided oil in exchange for medical doctors.

TeleSUR
Launched in 2005, TeleSUR is a media conglomerate that provides news and current affairs broadcasts throughout the ALBA bloc. The program is based on an internet based television channel and is a cooperative effort between the governments of Venezuela, Cuba and Nicaragua.

PETROSUR
PETROSUR is an inter-governmental energy alliance between Venezuelan PDVSA, Argentinean YPF, and Brazilian Petrobras nationalized oil companies. The goal of this initiative is to provide funding for social welfare programs within these nations.

Criticism
In August 2013, BBC News stated that "Alba consists of one oil-rich nation and various minnows wishing to benefit from its largesse" and that "there is little chance of the rhetoric becoming reality any time soon". As the crisis in Bolivarian Venezuela began, President Nicolás Maduro called on other ALBA members to begin contributing, though the smaller members distanced themselves from the proposal since they only sought the benefits from Venezuela.

In July 2018, President Lenín Moreno of Ecuador distanced himself from ALBA, stating that the organization "has not worked for a while." In August 2018, Ecuador officially withdrew from ALBA.

Karen Longaric, appointed as foreign minister by Jeanine Áñez's interim government, announced the formal departure of the country from ALBA in November 2019 over "interference" in Bolivia's political crisis.

See also

References

External links 

 
 
 Portal ALBA

Bolivarian Revolution
International organizations based in the Americas
Politics of the Americas
Trade blocs
Hugo Chávez
Anti-Americanism
Intergovernmental organizations established by treaty
Organizations established in 2004